Gigant is a rural locality (a settlement) in Malyginskoye Rural Settlement, Kovrovsky District, Vladimir Oblast, Russia. The population was 709 as of 2010. There are 6 streets.

Geography 
Gigant is located 14 km north of Kovrov (the district's administrative centre) by road. Kryachkovo is the nearest rural locality.

References 

Rural localities in Kovrovsky District